Cylloepus is a genus of riffle beetles in the family Elmidae. There are about six described species in Cylloepus.

Species
 Cylloepus abnormis (Horn, 1870)
 Cylloepus araneolus (Mueller, 1806)
 Cylloepus danforthi Musgrave, 1935
 Cylloepus haitianus (Darlington, 1936)
 Cylloepus lahottensis (Darlington, 1936)
 Cylloepus parkeri Sanderson, 1953 (Parker's cylloepus riffle beetle)

References

Further reading

 
 
 

Elmidae